Mats Åke Gren (born 20 December 1963) is a Swedish football coach and former player who played as a defender. He played for IFK Göteborg and Grasshopper during a professional career that spanned between 1978 and 2000. A full international between 1984 and 1992, he won 22 caps for the Sweden national team and represented his country at the 1990 FIFA World Cup. Gren was first playing as a forward, but as he was a utility player, the last ten years in Grasshopper he played as a defender and also became team captain.

Club career
Gren played for Falu BS 1982–1984. He then played for IFK Göteborg in 1984–1985 and became Swedish champion in 1984. Gren then moved to Grasshopper, where he played from 1985–2000. He won the Swiss National League five times (1990, 1991, 1995, 1996, 1998) and won four Swiss Cup titles (1988, 1989, 1990, 1994).

International career 
Gren played 22 games for the Swedish national team and was a member of the squad in the 1990 FIFA World Cup and participated in one game coming in as a substitute.

Coaching career
He was assistant manager of Grasshopper from 2009.

On 31 May 2009 he was named as the new head coach of Vejle Boldklub and signed over three years here between 30 June 2012.

Due to a poor start to the spring season of 2011, where Vejle dropped from 2nd to 3rd in the Danish 1st Division, Gren was sacked by the club board on 12 April 2011.

In 2014, Gren left his job as manager Jönköpings Södra to take the role as sporting director at IFK Göteborg. On 10 October 2018, with the club showing poor results and having financial difficulties, IFK Göteborg sacked Gren.

Career statistics

International

Honours

Player 
IFK Göteborg

 Swedish Champion: 1984

Grasshopper

 Swiss National League: 1989–90, 1990–91, 1994–95, 1995–96, 1997–98
 Swiss Cup: 1987–88, 1988–89, 1989–90, 1993–94

Manager
BK Häcken
 Damallsvenskan: 2020

References

1963 births
Living people
Swedish footballers
Sweden international footballers
1990 FIFA World Cup players
Sweden under-21 international footballers
Allsvenskan players
Swiss Super League players
IFK Göteborg players
Grasshopper Club Zürich players
Association football defenders
Expatriate footballers in Switzerland
Swedish expatriate sportspeople in Switzerland
Swedish football managers
IFK Göteborg directors and chairmen
FC Vaduz managers
Vejle Boldklub managers
Jönköpings Södra IF managers
Swedish expatriate football managers
Expatriate football managers in Denmark
Swedish expatriate sportspeople in Denmark
Expatriate football managers in Liechtenstein
People from Falun
Sportspeople from Dalarna County